Jai Shankar Kumar Singh  commonly known as Sangram Singh is the Zila Parishad of Patan block of Palamu district of Jharkhand state.

Born in Sanda village of Patan to Suryadeo Prasad Singh and Mangal Vrat Singh.

Sangram Singh is best known for his tremendous social work in recent 2020 covid lockdown where he  distributed tonnes of ration to poor families of Patan and Daltonganj. Sangram Singh also distributed masks and Sanitizers to thousands of people residing in patan and Daltonganj. He helped hundreds of migritant labours from all across India to reach their home.

Sangram Singh is active in politics from last few years and have a massive impact in Patan. In the recent Panchayat elections he performed tremendous, he crushed all his opponents from a huge margin setting a record votes for Zila Parishad in Jharkhand.

References

External links

People from Palamu district
Living people
Year of birth missing (living people)